Leaf v International Galleries [1950] 2 KB 86 is an English contract law case concerning misrepresentation, mistake and breach of contract, and the limits to the equitable remedy of rescission.

Facts
Salisbury Cathedral by John Constable was what Ernest Louis Leaf thought he was buying on 8 March 1944 from International Galleries. International Galleries said it was a Constable. Leaf paid £85. Five years later when he tried to auction it, Leaf was told that it was not a Constable. He claimed rescission of the contract against International Galleries, to get back his money.

Judgment
Denning LJ held that Mr Leaf was barred because too much time had lapsed. He held that in the event of lapse of too much time between the making of the contract and the decision to rescind, the right to rescind is lost. He held there was a mistake about the quality of the subject matter because both parties believed the picture to be a Constable, and that mistake was fundamental. But it was not enough to void the contract, because there was no mistake about the essential subject matter (a painting). The painter's identity was a term of the contract, which could either be classified as a condition (breach of which allows termination of the contract) or a warranty (which allows damages only). Here the painter's identity was a condition, but after hanging it in one's house for five years it is far too late to reject the painting for breach of condition.

Jenkins LJ and Lord Evershed MR concurred.

 Summary
In essence, the court held that there was no breach of contract, no "operative mistake", but there WAS misrepresentation. However, after a period of five years the right to rescission had lapsed, leaving the claimant with no remedy at all.

See also
Vitiating factors in the law of contract
Misrepresentation in English law
Misrepresentation Act 1967
Mistakes in English law
Salt v Stratstone Specialist Ltd [2015] EWCA Civ 745, damages in lieu unavailable if rescission would be, including the impossibility of restitutio in integrum.

References

External links
D Alberge, 'Michelangelo at the Met? Sotheby's painting claimed to be by Renaissance genius' (15 April 2010) The Guardian

English misrepresentation case law
Lord Denning cases
1950 in British law
Court of Appeal (England and Wales) cases
1950 in case law
John Constable
Art and culture law